Ploskovo is a rural locality (a village) in Yagnitskoye Rural Settlement, Cherepovetsky District, Vologda Oblast, Russia. The population was 107 as of 2002. There are 5 streets.

Geography 
Ramenye is the nearest rural locality.

References 

Rural localities in Cherepovetsky District